The CFE Company is a joint venture established by GE Aviation and the Garrett Engine Division of Allied Signal (now Honeywell Aerospace) in June 1987. The company produces the CFE738, a small turbofan engine used on the Dassault Falcon 2000. "CFE" stands for "Commercial Fan Engines".

Products
 CFE CFE738

References

External links
 GE Aviation CFE738 page

Aircraft engine manufacturers of the United States